DXER-TV, channel 12 (analog) and channel 18 (digital), is a commercial television station owned and operated by TV5 Network, Inc. through its licensee ABC Development Corporation. Its analog and digital transmitter are located at PLDT Building, Beatiles St., General Santos.

Digital television

Digital channels

UHF Channel 18 (497.143 MHz)

Areas of coverage

Primary areas  
 General Santos

Secondary areas 
 South Cotabato
 Sarangani

See also
TV5
List of TV5 Stations
Radyo5 97.5 News FM General Santos

Television stations in General Santos
TV5 (Philippine TV network) stations
Television channels and stations established in 1965
Digital television stations in the Philippines